Oeri is a Swiss surname. Notable people with this surname include:

 Gisela Oeri (born 1955), Swiss-German football chairwoman
 Hans Jakob Oeri (1782–1868), Swiss painter
  (born 1955), Swiss billionaire

See also
Oehri

Swiss-language surnames